Roddy Langmuir (born 8 June 1960) is a British former alpine skier who competed in the 1980 Winter Olympics. He then trained as an architect and is now a Practice Leader at Cullinan Studio, an award-winning architectural and masterplanning practice based in London, UK.

References

External links
 

1960 births
Living people
Scottish male alpine skiers
Olympic alpine skiers of Great Britain
Alpine skiers at the 1980 Winter Olympics